Shengang Township is a rural township in Changhua County, Taiwan.

Geography
Shengang had a population of 38,019 as of January 2023, 

History
During the Dutch period, the area was within the administrative region of Favorlang (modern-day Huwei, Yunlin).

Administrative divisions
The township comprises 14 villages: 
Beiqi, Biantou, Datong, Dingxing, Haiwei, Keliao, Qijia, Quancuo, Quanxing, Quanzhou, Shigu, Xide, Xingang and Zengjia.

Attractions 
 Fu'an Temple

References

External links

  Shengang Township Office, Changhua County 

Townships in Changhua County